Ostereidet Church is a parish church of the Church of Norway in Alver Municipality in Vestland county, Norway. It is located in the village of Ostereidet. It is one of two churches for the Osterfjorden parish which is part of the Nordhordland prosti (deanery) in the Diocese of Bjørgvin. The red, brick church was built in a long church design in 1988 using plans drawn up by the architect Bengt Suleng who worked for the Einar Vaardal-Lunde architectural firm. The church seats about 350 people. The church was consecrated on 18 December 1988.

See also
List of churches in Bjørgvin

References

Alver (municipality)
Churches in Vestland
Long churches in Norway
Brick churches in Norway
20th-century Church of Norway church buildings
Churches completed in 1988
1988 establishments in Norway